Wing Karjo (23 April 1937 in Garut, West Java – 19 March 2002 in Japan) was a prominent Indonesian poet who contributed actively to the development of Indonesian literature between 1965 and 1998.

Early life
Wing Karjo had his elementary and junior high school education in Tasikmalaya, then he moved back to Garut to have his senior high school education. After finishing the senior high school education, Wing Karjo went to Jakarta to study France literature.

References

1937 births
Indonesian male poets
2002 deaths
People from Garut
20th-century Indonesian poets
20th-century male writers